Admiral Gardner was launched in 1797 as an East Indiaman for the British East India Company (EIC). She made five voyages for the EIC, during the fourth of which she participated in an inconclusive single-ship action with a French privateer. Admiral Gardner was wrecked in January 1809. The wreck is a Protected Wreck managed by Historic England. She was named after Admiral Alan Gardner.

Career
EIC voyage #1 (1797-1799): Captain Edward Chapman Bradford acquired a letter of marque on 10 June 1797. He sailed from Torbay on 22 September 1797, bound for Bengal and Bencoolen. Admiral Gardner reached Kedgeree on 16 February 1798. On 27 June she reached Bencoolen, and by 11 August was back at Kedgeree. She was at Saugor on 24 September, and Bencoolen again on 5 November. Homeward bound, Admiral Gardner reached St Helena on 27 March 1799. Admiral Gardner returned to St Helena on 24 April. She arrived back at Blackwall on 4 August.

EIC voyage #2 (1801-1802): Captain Bradford sailed from Portsmouth on 31 March 1801, bound for Madras and China. Admiral Gardner reached Madras on 26 July. She was at Penang on 28 August and arrived at Whampoa Anchorage on 6 October. Homeward bound, she reached St Helena on 12 April 1802 and arrived at Blackwall on 12 July.

EIC voyage #3 (1803-1804): Captain Bradford sailed from the Downs on 1 February 1803, bound for Madras and Bengal. On 12 February Admiral Gardner was at Madeira. She reached the Cape of Good Hope on 23 April and Madras 13 June; she arrived at Diamond Harbour on 22 July. The next day Bradford acquired a letter of marque. Homeward bound, Admiral Gardner was at Saugor on 7 November, reached St Helena on 12 March 1804, and arrived at Blackwall on 11 June.

EIC voyage #4 (1805-1806): Captain George Saltwell acquired a letter of marque on 21 January 1805. He sailed from Portsmouth on 25 April 1805, bound for St Helena and Madras. A single-ship action ensued in which the French vessel was able to damage Admiral Gardners rigging. The privateer did not press the attack and by the next day she had disappeared. Admiral Gardner had 10 men wounded, three severely.

On 4 December Admiral Gardner reached Madras. Homeward bound, she was at Colombo on 21 February 1806, reached St Helena on 14 May, and arrived at Blackwall on 1 August.

On 4 August the East India Docks opened. In the celebration of the opening, the lead vessel to enter was the Trinity yacht, the yacht belonging to Trinity House. The next vessel was Admiral Gardner, chosen in recognition of her defense against the privateer. She was to have been third, after , Commodore Nathaniel Dance's  flagship at the Battle of Pulo Aura, but adverse winds prevented Earl Camdens arrival.

EIC voyage #5 (1807-1808): Captain William John Eastfield acquired a letter of marque on 30 December 1806. He sailed from Portsmouth on 26 February 1807, bound for Madras and Bengal.  Admiral Gardner reached Madras on 3 July  and Kedgeree on 21 July,  and arrived at Diamond Harbour on 26 July. Homeward bound, she was at Saugor on 16 September, Madras on 22 October, and the cape on 30 December. She reached St Helena on 25 January 1808, and arrived at Blackwall on 28 April.

Fate

On 24 January 1809, Captain Eastfield sailed from the Downs, bound for Madras and Bengal, at the start of Admiral Gardners sixth voyage for the EIC. The next day Admiral Gardner was lost on the Goodwin Sands off South Foreland when a gale tore her from her moorings. Three (or five) crew drowned.

Lost with Admiral Gardner was her cargo, a large number of EIC X and XX copper cash coins, belonging to Matthew Boulton.  The EIC put the value of its cargo at £21,579.

The same gale also wrecked , and the brig Apollo. Boatmen from Deal were able to rescue almost the entire crew from Admiral Gardner. Boatmen from Ramsgate and Broadstairs saved most of the crew of Britannia, but only one man from the brig.

A few days later Lloyd's List reported that all three wrecked vessels had gone to pieces.

Rediscovery
The wreck of Admiral Gardner was found in 1984 and some coins were salvaged in 1985 during a licensed dive. The wreck was designated under the Protection of Wrecks Act on 2 May 1985 and redesignated to extend the area covered on 5 October 2004.

Notes, citations and references
Notes

Citations

References

External links 

 "Admiral Gardner" National Heritage List for England

1797 ships
Ships built in England
Ships of the British East India Company
Age of Sail merchant ships of England
Maritime incidents in 1809
Shipwrecks in the Downs